Edward Kamanaloha Kenney, Jr. (August 8, 1933 – October 5, 2018) was an American singer and actor from Hawaii best known for the role of "Wang Ta" in the original Broadway production of Flower Drum Song. In retirement, he lived on the island of Kaua‘i and occasionally made public appearances.

Family
Born in Honolulu on Oahu to a Hawaiian-Chinese mother and a Swedish-Irish father. He married Judy Bailey and lived on Kauai.

Kenney was married to hula dancer Beverly Noa and was the father of Honolulu restaurateur, Edward Kenney, III.

Kenney and Noa headlined shows at the Royal Hawaiian Hotel and the Halekulani Hotel for years. They reunited for a Honolulu television show on KGMB-TV in the 1980s.

Stage credits

Broadway
 13 Daughters as Mana, Prince of Hawai‘i (1961)
 Flower Drum Song as Wang Ta (1958–1960)
 Shangri-La as Rimshi (1956)

Honolulu Community Theater
 Principal "Ali Baba" role during late 1960s in large hit production of Kismet musical.
Various other productions (1950s and after)

University of Oregon
 Brigadoon

President William McKinley High School Theater
 13 Daughters as Chun (late 1980s)

Hawaii Theatre
 13 Daughters as Kahuna (early 1990s)

Discography

Albums

Solo
 Exotic Sounds of the Spice Island (Columbia, 1960)
 My Hawai‘i (Columbia, 1962) (later reissued with a different cover on a Columbia budget label, Harmony)
 Ed Kenney's Hawaii (ABC/Paramount, 1962) (later reissued with a different cover by Decca, 196?)
 Somewhere in Hawai‘i (Waikiki, 1964)
 Waikiki (Decca, 1966)
 Royal Hawaiian Luau (Decca, 1967)
 An Island (Lehua, 1977)

Included
 Hawaii's Favorite Christmas Songs – Vol 2 (1999)
 Hawaii's Sunset Melodies (1996)
 Hawaii's Golden Treasures (1996)
 Hawaii's Favorite Christmas Songs (1993)
 Flower Drum Song: 1958 Original Broadway Cast (1958)

Singles
 "Numbah One Day of Christmas" the Hawaiian Pidgin version of The Twelve Days of Christmas
Co-wrote this with Eaton "Bob" Magoon, Jr. (13 Daughters composer) and Gordon Phelps.

References

External links
 
 
 Liner notes from My Hawaii album

1933 births
2018 deaths
Musicians from Honolulu
American male musical theatre actors
Nightclub performers
American people of Chinese descent
American people of Swedish descent
American people of Irish descent